Václavovice is a municipality and village in Ostrava-City District in the Moravian-Silesian Region of the Czech Republic. It has about 2,100 inhabitants. It lies in the historical region of Cieszyn Silesia.

History
Václavovice was founded during the colonization of Cieszyn Silesia in the late the 13th century. The first written mention is from 1302 under its Latin name Wenceslaowitz.

Politically the village belonged initially to the Duchy of Teschen, formed in 1290 in the process of feudal fragmentation of Poland and was ruled by a local branch of Piast dynasty. In 1327 the duchy became a fee of Kingdom of Bohemia, which after 1526 became part of the Habsburg monarchy.

References

External links

 

Villages in Ostrava-City District
Cieszyn Silesia